The 1974 Basque Pelota World Championships were the 7th edition of the Basque Pelota World Championships organized by  the FIPV.

Participating nations

Others

Events
A total of 12 events were disputed, in 4 playing areas.

Trinquete, 5 events disputed

Fronton (30 m), 2 events disputed

Fronton (36 m), 4 events disputed

Fronton (54 m), 1 event disputed

Medal table

References

World Championships,1974
1974 in sports
Sport in Montevideo
1974 in Uruguayan sport
November 1974 sports events in South America
December 1974 sports events in South America
International sports competitions hosted by Uruguay
World Championships,1974
World Championships